The Battle of Tololing was a pivotal battle in the Kargil War between India's 2nd Rajputana Rifles's and troops from one full battalion of Pakistan’s Northern Light Infantry who were aided by Pakistani irregulars in 1999.

The Tololing peak dominates over the Srinagar-Leh Highway (NH 1D), which is a vital link. Many of the Indian Army losses had to do with the nature of the terrain, as World War I style frontal charges had to be mounted to dislodge the intruders and reclaim the peaks. The three-week assault finally culminated with India taking control of the peak and changing the course of the war.

Major Rajesh Adhikari (posthumously), Major Vivek Gupta (posthumously), Major Padmapani Acharya (posthumously) and Havildar Digendra Kumar were awarded the Maha Vir Chakra, India's second highest military honour for their daring actions on the peak. Col Ravindranath and Captain Vijayant Thappar were awarded Vir Chakra.

In popular culture 
Turning Point at Tololing, a feature documentary hosted by Maj Gen G. D. Bakshi, aired on the Indian television channel Epic TV. It details the political and military background and course of the battle.

References

External links 
Bharat Rakshak

Tololing
Tololing
1999 in India
1999 in Pakistan